William Thomas Turner Grieve (April 25, 1900 – August 15, 1979) was a professional baseball umpire who worked in the American League from 1938 to 1955. Grieve umpired 2,783 major league games in his 18-year career. He umpired in three World Series (1941, 1948 and 1953 and two All-Star Games (1941 and 1949).

Career
Grieve was promoted from the American Association to the American League in 1938.

See also 

 List of Major League Baseball umpires

References

External links
The Sporting News umpire card

1900 births
1979 deaths
Major League Baseball umpires
Sportspeople from New York (state)
People from Yonkers, New York